Mathieu Biron (born April 29, 1980) is a Canadian former professional ice hockey player who played over 250 games in the National Hockey League (NHL). After retiring as a hockey player, he became a firefighter.

Playing career
As a youth, Biron played in the 1994 Quebec International Pee-Wee Hockey Tournament with a minor ice hockey team from Charlesbourg, Quebec City. He was drafted by the National Hockey League's (NHL) Los Angeles Kings in the first round (twenty-first overall) of the 1998 NHL Entry Draft.

New York Islanders traded Žigmund Pálffy, Bryan Smolinski, Marcel Cousineau and 4th round selection (previously acquired from the New Jersey Devils - Daniel Johansson) in 1999 to the Los Angeles Kings for Olli Jokinen, Josh Green, Mathieu Biron and 1st round selection (Taylor Pyatt) in 1999.

On November 24, 2003, Biron became the first NHL player in 23 years to score a goal against his brother when he finished a 2-on-1 against older brother Martin, in a victory over the Buffalo Sabres.

Biron was traded to the Canadiens on December 15, 2006 via a trade with the San Jose Sharks for Patrick Traverse.

His last season in the NHL came in 2005-06, when he made 52 appearances for the Washington Capitals. He then spent two years in the AHL, playing for the Worcester Sharks and Hamilton Bulldogs.

Biron signed with the Frankfurt Lions of the German top-flight Deutsche Eishockey Liga (DEL) for the 2008-09 season and moved to fellow DEL team Hamburg Freezers for the 2009-10 campaign.

From 2010 to 2012 he turned out to conclude his playing career for Thetford Mines Isothermic in the LNAH.

Personal
His older brother Martin Biron is a former goaltender who played 16 seasons in the NHL.

After his hockey career, Biron trained and studied to become a firefighter in Lévis, Quebec.

Career statistics

Regular season and playoffs

International

See also
Notable families in the NHL

References

External links

1980 births
Living people
Canadian expatriate ice hockey players in Germany
Canadian ice hockey defencemen
Canadian firefighters
Florida Panthers players
Frankfurt Lions players
French Quebecers
Hamburg Freezers players
Hamilton Bulldogs (AHL) players
Ice hockey people from Quebec City
Los Angeles Kings draft picks
Lowell Lock Monsters players
National Hockey League first-round draft picks
New York Islanders players
San Antonio Rampage players
Shawinigan Cataractes players
Springfield Falcons players
Tampa Bay Lightning players
Washington Capitals players
Worcester Sharks players